Keraboss Super K is a car designed and produced by Athens-based Keraboss cars manufacturing.

Pavlos Kerabos (company name is spelled as ‘Keraboss') founded Keraboss Design  in 1975, specializing in car conversions (including cabrio and hardtop versions), license production of light jeep-type vehicles, and (later) auto tuning. 

Development of the Super K model started in 2008, with two prototypes introduced in 2011. 
The car is a light, SUV-type vehicle, and received type certification in 2021. Series production of a modernized version started in June 2022, with first export (to France) reported in December 2022.

References

External links
Company website
 
Car manufacturers of Greece
Cars of Greece